Robert Hanley (19 October 1887 – 25 March 1976) was a British gymnast. He competed in the men's artistic individual all-around event at the 1908 Summer Olympics.

References

1887 births
1976 deaths
British male artistic gymnasts
Olympic gymnasts of Great Britain
Gymnasts at the 1908 Summer Olympics
Place of birth missing
20th-century British people